Grace M. Davis High School, commonly referred to as Davis High School, is a public high school located in Modesto, California, United States. Established in 1961, the school serves students in grades 9-12. Davis High was recognized as a California Distinguished School in 2005.

History

Davis High School was established in what was then a rural setting, and was meant to serve approximately 1800 students from predominantly agricultural based families of north Modesto and Salida. As Modesto and Salida have grown, so has Davis High School. Davis later served more than 2800 students.

However, after the opening of Joseph Gregori High School in Modesto, CA, Davis High School's student population again dropped below 2000 as a large portion of the student body enrolled at Gregori for the start of the 2010-2011 school year.

Campus

The campus consists of three locker rows, an activity court or quad area used mainly for lunch consumption and student body activities, and approximately 100 classrooms.  The campus is bordered, on the North Side, by Rumble Road, and on the West side by Tully Road.  The South side of the campus is bordered by the Davis football field, tracks, and soccer fields.  To the East, adjacent to the campus, is Davis Park, a recreational area.  There is also a picnic area that used to have awnings covering the benches.  After Davis became a closed campus, students continued to frequent the park during school hours, subjecting them to consequences for being out of bounds per board policy.

Curriculum

The school participates in the California Partnership Academies program, which provides school-within-a-school opportunities for students interested in pursuing careers in health sciences and public safety:

The Health Careers Academy, exclusive to the Grace Davis campus, is a four-year "school-within-a-school" program filled with college preparatory classes.

Avid it stands for Advancement Via Individual Determination this program helps students get into a four-year college after they graduate high school.

The Davis High School Public Safety Academy is a three-year "school within a school" program, with a recommended freshman pre-academy year, which offers a college preparatory academic curriculum as well as vocational experiences for students interested in careers in criminal justice and public safety.

This program provides a thematic approach for core courses in the field of public safety and career exploration. The sophomore year introduces the academy concepts in the English, science, world history, and Public Safety Tech I classes.  In the junior and senior years, students will continue to explore careers in public safety through their government, English, advanced math, and science classes, in addition to taking a CERT/First Responder course. Upon completion of the CERT/First Responder course, students are eligible to be members of the on-campus emergency preparedness and response team.

Additionally, Davis offers a four-year Middle College program. The program is designed to allow students to take college classes in their regular school day. Students complete online classes in the regular school day and have the opportunity to earn college credits.

Extracurricular activities
Student groups and activities include A.C.T.S., Academic Decathlon, anime club, band, Black Student Union, California Scholarship Federation, chess club, conflict mediation, gamers' club, gay-straight alliance, dance, drama, French club, FBLA, FFA, Future Fashion Designers, FHA, international club, Latino Student Union/Hispanic Youth Leadership Council, mock trial, music, Reach and Teach Tutoring, racing club, recycling, Science Bowl, Science Olympiad, and VICA/Skills USA.

Student publications include a newspaper, Corinthian; yearbook; and Corinthian TV, which airs on SchoolTube.com.

Athletics
Grace M. Davis High School belongs to the Modesto Metropolitan Conference in the Sac-Joaquin Section of the California Interscholastic Federation. Prior to the conference's creation in 2004, the school belonged to the Central California Conference. The teams, known as the Spartans, compete in baseball, basketball, cross country, football, golf, soccer, softball, swimming, tennis, track, volleyball, water polo, and wrestling.

The Spartans have generally dominated the Modesto high school sports scene especially in football, winning the Modesto city title several times with 2007 being the latest since 2002. The Spartans are the only Modesto high school football team to play for a Sac-Joaquin Section title, losing to Elk Grove High School of Sacramento 22-3 at Modesto Junior College Stadium in 1984.

The Spartans athletic teams have won nine Sac-Joaquin Section titles in:

65-66 Individual Wrestling
66-67 Boys Golf
69-70 Boys Golf
74-75 D1 Boys Golf
81-82 D1 Girls Tennis

85-86 D1 Boys Tennis
93-94 D1 Softball
01-02 D1 Boys Track
02-03 D1 Boys Cross Country

Notable alumni

Al Autry - pitched one game for the Atlanta Braves
Lincoln Brewster (1989) - Christian recording artist
 Meghan Camarena (2005) – YouTube personality, The Amazing Race contestant, and television host
Ray Lankford - Major League Baseball player, primarily for the St. Louis Cardinals
Chandra Levy (1995) - an intern in Washington, D.C., who disappeared in the spring of 2001 and is presumed murdered
James Marsters (1980) - film and television actor
Michael McDonald (2009) - professional Mixed Martial Artist formerly with the UFC, current Bellator MMA Bantamweight
Tisha Venturini - soccer player on the US women's team in the 1996 Olympics
Ashley Walker - was the star player on the UC Berkeley women's basketball team 2005-2009. Now plays for WNBA team Seattle Storm.
Kerry McCoy - guitarist for blackgaze band, Deafheaven
George Clarke - singer for blackgaze band, Deafheaven

References

External links
 Grace M. Davis High website
 Corinthian Online (Davis's official newspaper website)
 Grace M. Davis Band & Colorguard Boosters

Educational institutions established in 1959
High schools in Stanislaus County, California
Education in Modesto, California
Public high schools in California
1959 establishments in California